Ribe Kunstmuseum is an art museum in Ribe, Denmark.

History
Ribe Kunstmuseum was inaugurated in 1891. The museum is located in a villa which was formerly the  private residence of factory owner Balthazar Giørtz (1827–1891). The  villa  built between 1860–1864 after drawings made by the architect and royal surveyor Laurits Albert Winstrup (1815–1889).

The museum's main building and the octagonal gazebo together with the garden and front yard were restored and partially modernized during the years 2009–2010. The newly renovated museum was inaugurated November 26, 2010.

Collection
The collections show the main line of Danish pictorial art from c. 1750 to 1940 including masterpieces by 
 Jens Juel
 C. W. Eckersberg
 Christen Købke
 Kristian Zahrtmann
 L. A. Ring
 P. S. Krøyer
 Anna Ancher
 Michael Ancher
 William Scharff

References

External links
Ribe Kunstmuseum website

Art museums established in 1891
Art museums and galleries in Denmark
1891 establishments in Denmark
Museums in the Region of Southern Denmark
Kunstmuseum